Rader is a German surname and may refer to:

People

Abbey Rader (born 1943), American drummer
Andrew Rader, Canadian aerospace engineer
Brad Rader, American comic book writer
Bruce Rader (born 1954), American broadcaster
Daniel Rader, American professor
Danny Rader (born 1981), American musician
Dave Rader (disambiguation), multiple people
David Rader (born 1957), American football coach
Dean Rader, American writer
Dennis Rader (born 1945), American serial killer
Don Rader (disambiguation), multiple people
Dotson Rader (born 1942), American playwright
Doug Rader (born 1944), American baseball player
Drew Rader (1901–1975), American baseball player
Erich Raeder (1876–1960), German admiral
Frank Rader (1848–1897), American politician
Gary Rader (1944–1973), American army officer
Howie Rader (1921–1991), American basketball player
Jack Rader, American politician
Jason Rader (born 1981), American football player
Kevin Rader (disambiguation), multiple people
L. E. Rader (1864–1910), American politician
Len Rader (1921–1996), American basketball player
Lloyd E. Rader Sr. (1906–1986), American politician
Marie Rader (born 1941), American politician
Matthew Rader (1561–1634), Italian philologist
Melvin Rader (1903–1981), American author
Michael Rader, American actor
Paul Rader (born 1934), American religious leader
Paul Rader (evangelist) (1878–1938), American evangelist
Peary Rader (1909–1991), American bodybuilder
Randall Ray Rader (born 1949), American judge
Richard Rader (born 1959), U.S. Virgin Island equestrian 
Stanley Rader (1930–2002), American attorney
Stephanie Rader (1915–2016), American undercover agent
William C. Rader (born 1938), American psychiatrist

See also
 Rader, Missouri, a community in the United States
 Rader's FFT algorithm, fast Fourier transform algorithm that computes the discrete Fourier transform of prime sizes
 Ræder

German-language surnames